"Piss on Pity" is a slogan coined by musician Johnny Crescendo (Alan Holdsworth) in 1990 to protest stereotypes of disabled people. It was first deployed during the 1990 and 1992 Block Telethon protests outside of ITV Studios in the United Kingdom. The slogan was printed on t-shirts and thousands were sold.

"Piss On Pity" is a rallying cry for those in the disability-inclusive circles of world politics. According to its proponents, the implication of the slogan is that pity, while seeming to be a positive, helpful emotion, actually is derogatory. According to them, it is based in conscious or unconscious aversion to disabled people and the ableism that that aversion consciously or unconsciously represents. According to Barbara Lisicki, an organizer of the Block Telethon protests, on the BBC show Network in 1989, "If you make a disabled person an object of charity, you're not going to see them as your equal."

Activists using the slogan will often explain that their ultimate goal in a militant, provocative slogan of this type is to get across the message that, like anti-racism and anti-sexism, they want to purge pity from worldwide social discourse on disability, at both the governmental and cultural levels, and instead foster disability-inclusive practices and equal power politics.

"Piss on Pity" was the title of an exhibition by disabled artists, that took place in Wakefield, UK, in 2019. Their artwork reflected the antipathy of the disabled people's movement towards charity. The exhibition showed disabled artists challenging the widespread idea that charity is a force wholly for good.

See also
Disabled People's Direct Action Network
Disability rights movement
Independent living
Kyriarchy

References

Disability rights
Political catchphrases